N-terminal EF-hand calcium-binding protein 2 is a protein that in humans is encoded by the NECAB2 gene.

Model organisms

Model organisms have been used in the study of NECAB2 function. A conditional knockout mouse line, called Necab2tm1a(KOMP)Wtsi was generated as part of the International Knockout Mouse Consortium program — a high-throughput mutagenesis project to generate and distribute animal models of disease to interested scientists — at the Wellcome Trust Sanger Institute.

Male and female animals underwent a standardized phenotypic screen to determine the effects of deletion. Twenty five tests were carried out on mutant mice but no significant abnormalities were observed.

References

Further reading

Genes mutated in mice
EF-hand-containing proteins